League Stadium is a baseball stadium in Huntingburg, Indiana, United States, located at 203 South Cherry Street. Originally built in 1894, League Stadium is the home of the Dubois County Bombers of the collegiate summer Ohio Valley League and formerly the Dubois County Dragons of the independent Frontier League.  The Southridge Raiders, an Indiana High School Athletic Association 3A baseball team, also use the field.  The Dragons moved to Kenosha, Wisconsin in 2003.  The ballpark has a capacity of 2,783 people.

The ballpark opened in 1894 and was renovated in 1991 for the filming of A League of Their Own, adding additional seating to the park while maintaining the original grandstand.  In 1995, the stadium served as the set of Soul of the Game, an HBO movie.

Dimensions
Left field – 332 ft.
Center field – 385 ft.
Right field – 320 ft.

References

Sports venues in Indiana
Minor league baseball venues
Buildings and structures in Dubois County, Indiana
Tourist attractions in Dubois County, Indiana
1894 establishments in Indiana